Parea me ton Harry (Greek: Παρέα με τον Χάρη; English: Parea me ton Harry) is the 29th studio album by Greek singer Yiannis Parios. It was released in Greece in 1995 by Minos EMI. It reached 3× platinum status. This is the second collaboration of Yannis Parios with his songwriter son Harry Varthakouris after their 1984 classic hit "Pio kali i monaxia".

Track listing

Music videos
Ypervoles
To tragoudi you Harry 2 (Erotas sinai tharro)

Release history

Credits and personnel

Personnel

Antonis Gounaris - guitars, acoustic guitars
Nikos Hatzopoulos - violin
Giorgos Roilos - percussion
Giannis Mpithikotsis - bouzouki, tzoura, baglama, mandolin
Nikos Kouros - accordion
Harry Varthakouris - music, orchestration, programming, keyboards and background vocals

Production
Konstadinos Theofilou - sound, mix
Achilleas Theofilou - production manager

Credits adapted from the album's liner notes.

References

Yiannis Parios albums
1995 albums
Minos EMI albums